Lawrence J. Anastasia, Jr. (December 20, 1926 – July 24, 2008) was a member of the Connecticut House of Representatives for 18 years. He represented the 138th District. He also served on the Norwalk Common Council from 1967 to 1975.

Early life 
Anastasia was born and raised in Norwalk, Connecticut. He was the son of Lawrence J. Anastasia, Sr., and Ida Christiano Anastasia. He was drafted into the US Army in 1944. He was the co-owner with his brother Peter of Anastasia Brothers, a grocery store on Newtown Avenue for 50 years.

Political career 
He was a member of the Connecticut House of Representatives representing Norwalk's 138th District for 18 years. He served on the Norwalk Common Council for 12 years. In 1992, the legislature redistricted Anastasia's residence placing him and fellow incumbent Democrat Alex Knopp in the same district.

Associations 
 Member, Regional Advisory Council, Norwalk State Technical College 
 Member, Board of Directors, Elderhouse, Inc.
 Founder, Team sponsor, Cranbury Little League
 Member, Sons of Italy, Pietro Micca Lodge
 Director, Cranbury Civic Association
 Member, American Legion Post 12
 Member, Laurel Athletic League
 Member, Norwalk Old Timers

References 

1926 births
2008 deaths
United States Army personnel of the Korean War
Burials in Saint John's Cemetery (Norwalk, Connecticut)
Connecticut city council members
Members of the Connecticut House of Representatives
Politicians from Norwalk, Connecticut
United States Army soldiers
University of Bridgeport alumni
20th-century American politicians
United States Army personnel of World War II